Yelena Vladimirovna Slesarenko, née Sivushenko (born February 28, 1982, in Volgograd) is a Russian high jumper.

Largely unknown before 2004, she kick started the season by clearing 2.04 metres and winning the World Indoor Championships. When the outdoor season started she won the SPAR European Cup with the same result, improving her personal best from 1.97 (achieved in 2002). She continued her good form at the 2004 Summer Olympics, winning the gold medal with a new national and personal record of 2.06 metres, beating the previous Olympic record, set by Stefka Kostadinova in 1996. After clearing 2.06 she made decent attempts at 2.10, which would have been a world record. She rounded off the season by winning the World Athletics Final.

Injuries kept her away from most of the 2005 season, including the 2005 World Championships.

Early in 2006, however, she won the World Indoor Championships with 2.02 metres. She finished fifth in the 2006 European Athletics Championships, failing to clear 2.00 m.

At the 2008 Beijing Summer Olympics, Slesarenko finished fourth in the women's high jump with a jump of 2.01 meters, failing to clear 2.03 meters after three tries. However, in 2016 both she and her compatriot, bronze-medalist Anna Chicherova, were disqualified from this event after failing a retest of drug samples from Beijing.

Slesarenko retired in 2014 after a successful career, but in 2022 she was further disqualified for doping and her results were cancelled from 2008 onward, although she retained her 2004 Olympic gold medal. She is currently a director of a winter sports academy in Volgograd, her home city.

International competitions

See also
List of doping cases in athletics
List of Olympic medalists in athletics (women)
List of 2004 Summer Olympics medal winners
List of IAAF World Indoor Championships medalists (women)
List of high jump national champions (women)
List of Russian sportspeople
List of people from Volgograd
Doping at the Olympic Games
High jump at the Olympics

References

1982 births
Living people
Sportspeople from Volgograd
Russian female high jumpers
Olympic athletes of Russia
Olympic gold medalists for Russia
Olympic gold medalists in athletics (track and field)
Athletes (track and field) at the 2004 Summer Olympics
Athletes (track and field) at the 2008 Summer Olympics
Medalists at the 2004 Summer Olympics
Universiade medalists in athletics (track and field)
Universiade bronze medalists for Russia
Medalists at the 2003 Summer Universiade
World Athletics Championships athletes for Russia
World Athletics Indoor Championships winners
Doping cases in athletics
Russian sportspeople in doping cases